2010 W-League might refer to:

 2010 W-League (Australia)
 2010 USL W-League season